Landschap Noord-Holland is a Dutch foundation which aims to protect the landscape and nature of the province of North Holland by acquiring, managing, repairing, and developing land. It is one of twelve national Landschapsorganisaties that make up Landschapsbeheer Nederland

Landschap Noord-Holland came about in 2003 as a merger between Noordhollandsch Landschap (1936) and Noord-Hollands Landschap. The foundation owns 96 nature reserves with a combined area of 4.500 ha, and manages another 125 areas, along with 150 km worth of bank, dike, and berm. It has over 33,000 members, and is supported by a number of companies as well as the province of North Holand and the Nationale Postcode Loterij.

References

External link 
 

Environmental organisations based in the Netherlands
Geography of North Holland